Midnight Runners is a 2017 South Korean action comedy film directed by Jason Kim (Kim Ju-hwan) and starring Park Seo-joon and Kang Ha-neul. The film was released on 9 August 2017. An Indian remake titled Saakini Daakini was released on 16 September 2022.

Plot 
Ki-joon and Hee-yeol are students at the Korean National Police University. One day, around midnight, they witness a kidnapping of a girl named Yun-Jung on their way back from the club. The local police station's missing persons department, however, is busy with the kidnapping of a son of a business mogul at the time and is unable to investigate the case. Knowing that they are in the critical hours after a kidnapping, they embark on their amateur investigation. When Ki-joon and Hee-yeol catch up with the kidnappers, it appears that the gang is running an unfertilized egg harvesting ring and there are many more girls locked up at their hideout.

Ki-joon and Hee-yeol tries to save them but are instead beaten and locked up. After escaping their captors, they return the next day to an empty hideout and a cold trail. As they are not acting police officers, their professor Yang Sung-il tells them not to pursue the case any further. Unable to wait for the bureaucracy to resolve the case, they once again embark on their own investigation. They undergo heavy physical training and manage to track the kidnappers down, with the help of CCTV footage, to a fertility clinic. Armored up with weapons, the duo venture in to liberate the girls by themselves, this time much more prepared.

They successfully take down all the kidnappers and their boss Yang-choon. Unable to arrest the kidnappers and rescue all the kidnapped girls themselves, they call the police in, knowing they might get expelled for their actions. However, due to some among the disciplinary committee believing that they had done the right thing morally, they are instead held back a year in their studies and sentenced to 500 hours of community service, leaving the two satisfied with the outcome. In a mid-credit scene, Yun-Jung visits Ki-joon and Hee-yeol as they're serving their community service and thanks them for rescuing her.

Cast

Main 
 Park Seo-joon as Park Ki-joon
Ki-joon is a light-hearted, risk-taker who acts first and thinks later.
 Kang Ha-neul as Kang Hee-yeol
Hee-yeol is the total opposite of Ki-joon. He is fairly nerdy and more of a thinker than a doer.

Others 
 Park Ha-sun as Lee Joo-hee (Medusa)
 Sung Dong-il as Professor Yang Sung-il
 Go Jun as Yang-choon
 Bae Yoo-ram as Jae-ho
 Lee Ho-jung as Lee Yoon-jung
 Lee Jun-hyuk as Professor Ha
 Seo Jung-yeon as Ki-joon's mother
 Choi Hong-il as Hee-yeol's father
 Lee Eun-saem as Eun-sam
 Byeon Woo-seok as Club entertainer	
 Jung Ye-ji as Dan-yeong, Police Force Student
 Ryu Kyung-soo as Police academy conscripted policeman
 Lee Se-hee as club woman Se-hee

Production 
Midnight Runners marks Park Seo-joon's first time playing a lead role in a film.

Midnight Runners was sold to six countries at the Hong Kong International Film & TV Market. The rights to the film have been purchased by companies including Japan's The Klockworx, Taiwan's Long Shong, Hong Kong's Deltamac HK, Philippines' Viva Comm and Singapore's Purple Plan.

Filming began on 21 November 2016 in Yongin, Gyeonggi Province, South Korea and ended on 23 February 2017.

Release and reception

Local
The film was released on 9 August 2017. It was screened across South Korea in 1,058 theatres. The film placed second at the box office on the opening day and earned US$1.97 million with a total of 308,303 ticket sales.

Within the first eight days after its release, the movie garnered 2.73 million admissions, earning a total of US$18.9 million, which exceeded the production budget of US$6.13 million.

By 20 August, less than two weeks after the movie was released, Midnight Runners had been watched by a total of 3,906,566 people. By 21 August, within 13 days after its premiere, the movie surpassed 4 million ticket sales. As of 24 August, the film has grossed US$30 million with a total of 4.3 million ticket sales. The total number of admissions increased to 4.83 million by 27 August 19 days after the movie was released, and the film earned a gross income of US$34.04 million. As of 14 September, five weeks after its release, the film reached 5.61 million admissions mark with US$39 million gross, making it the 7th highest-grossing South Korean film in 2017.

International
Midnight Runners was screened in 12 countries. After the initial release in local cinemas, the film was released in Indonesia on 23 August, followed by North America on 25 August, Australia on 31 August then proceeded to be screened in New Zealand, Hong Kong, Britain, Singapore, Malaysia, Japan, Taiwan, Vietnam, and the Philippines.

Remake 
The official Indian remake in Telugu language is titled Saakini Daakini, was produced by Guru Films and Suresh Productions. It stars Regina Cassandra and Nivetha Thomas in the lead roles, and was directed by Sudheer Varma, where the film was released on 16 September 2022.

Awards and nominations

References

External links 
 Midnight Runners at Daum (Korean)
 Midnight Runners at Naver (Korean)
 Midnight Runners at Movist (Korean)

2017 films
2010s Korean-language films
South Korean action comedy films
South Korean buddy films
Films about kidnapping
Police detective films
2017 action comedy films
2010s buddy cop films
Films set in Seoul
Films set in universities and colleges
Films set in police academies
Films shot in Seoul
Films shot in Gyeonggi Province
Lotte Entertainment films
2017 comedy films
2010s South Korean films